René Schwaeblé (11th arrondissement of Paris, 13 March 1873 – 1938) was a French writer who authored several popular novels, notably in the crime fiction and romance novel genres.

In addition to popular scientific and esoteric books, at the turn of the century he began writing fiction. After the publication of social novels, including Les Détraqués de Paris : étude des mœurs contemporaines (1904), he limited himself essentially to crime fiction and sentimental novels.

Works 
non-exhaustive list

Novels 
1899: Notre fin, Éditions A. Charles
1904: Les Détraqués de Paris : étude des mœurs contemporaines, Bibliothèque Fin de siècle
1907: Dans la peau, Librairie artistique
1913: L'Amour à passions, Éditions J. Fort
1913: Miss Betty, suivi de Chez Satan, Librairie artistique
1920: Mœurs câlines, Éditions modernes
1920: Perversion passionnelles, Éditions modernes
1920: Folie d'amour, Éditions Ferenczi & fils
1927: Le Rayon invisible, Éditions Ferenczi & fils
1932: Le Poison mystérieux, Éditions Ferenczi & fils
1933: Le Sosie du bandit, Éditions Ferenczi & fils
1933: Qui donc sème la mort ?, Éditions Ferenczi & fils
1934: Le Diamant-espion, Éditions Ferenczi & fils
1935: La Mort qu'on promène, Éditions Ferenczi & fils
1935: Cercueils et Bandits, Éditions Ferenczi & fils

Other 
1908: Les Voluptés de la morphine, Bibliothèque de l'inconnu
1911: Biologie minérale, Éditions H. Daragon
1914: Les Excentricités médicales, Éditions J. Rousset
1914: Les pierres vivent et meurent, Éditions Le François
1914: La Santé par les simples, avec le moyen de reconnaître les bons champignons, Éditions A.-L. Guyot
1922: Voulez-vous connaître les oraisons et les secrets merveilleux ?, Éditions H. Billy
1922: Voulez-vous connaître la magie ?, Éditions H. Billy
1922: Voulez-vous parler avec les morts ?, Éditions H. Billy
1922: Voulez-vous connaître l'avenir, la caractère et le tempérament ?, Éditions H. Billy
1922: Voulez-vous vous soigner vous-même ?, Éditions H. Billy
1930: Voulez-vous forcer l'amour ?, Éditions H. Billy
1930: Voulez-vous acquérir et fortifier la volonté ? réussir en tout ?'', Éditions H. Billy

External links 
 Notice BNF
 Bibliographie

20th-century French novelists
French crime fiction writers
Writers from Paris
1873 births
1938 deaths